Enaretta varia is a species of beetle in the family Cerambycidae. It was described by Pascoe in 1886.

References

Enaretta
Beetles described in 1886